Doreen C. Broadnax, known professionally as Sparky D, or spelled Sparky Dee (born June 2, 1965) is an American hip–hop musician and rapper. Broadnax is noted as one of the first female battle rappers, first gaining attention through the Roxanne Wars; when she responded to Roxanne Shante's "Roxanne's Revenge" with "Sparky's Turn (Roxanne, You're Through)" in 1985.

Biography

Early life
Born in Brooklyn, Broadnax was born to a Caucasian mother and African-American father. Broadnax was raised in the Van Dyke Housing Projects in the Brownsville neighborhood.

Career
Broadnax began her music career around 1983 when she became a member of a local hip-hop group, The Playgirls. The group, which consisted of Lisa (whose stage name was City Slim) and Mona (whose stage name was Mo Ski) recruited Broadnax to join after listening to her rap at a local hangout. After joining the group, The Playgirls recorded "Our Picture of a Man" for Sutra Records in 1983; later released in 1984. During her time with the group, Broadnax was introduced to rapper and music producer Spyder D. 
 
In 1984, 14-year-old rapper Roxanne Shante released "Roxanne's Revenge," a response to U.T.F.O.'s record "Roxanne, Roxanne," a song about a woman who would not respond to their advances. After listening to Shante's song on WBLS' Mr. Magic's Rap Attack on New Year's Eve 1985, Spyder-D decided that Broadnax would respond to Shante's record the following day. Taking offense to Shante's attack on a fellow Brooklyn crew, Broadnax responded with "Sparky's Turn (Roxanne You're Through)" under the NIA Records label; It was produced by Spyder-D. The single sold more than 300,000 copies in days of its release, later becoming certified gold.

This, in turn, kicked off the Roxanne Wars, is a well-known series of hip hop rivalries during the mid–1980s, yielding perhaps the most answer records in history. In 1985, capitalizing off the success of both records, Roxanne Shante and Broadnax released "Round One, Roxanne Shanté vs Sparky Dee" on Spin Records which included a battle track, in which the two rappers freestyle and diss each other. In subsequent years, Broadnax released a few tracks including d "He’s My DJ" b/w "She’s So Def" with Kool DJ Red Alert in 1985 and "Throwdown" in 1987. The year 1988 saw the release of her first full-length album on B-Boy Records, This is Sparky D's World. Broadnax continues to stay active in the hip hop community, working with various old school artists on hip hop gospel records including MC Shy D, Spyder D, Roxanne Shante, Kool DJ Red Alert and K Wiz.

Personal life
Broadnax has stated in interviews that she was a victim of domestic abuse, struggled with a crack cocaine addiction and was involved in prostitution sometime after the height of her career. In 2017, Broadnax was portrayed by Cheryse Dyllan in Netflix film Roxanne, Roxanne, a biopic about the life of Roxanne Shante.

References

External links 

1965 births
African-American women rappers
Living people
People from Brownsville, Brooklyn
Rappers from Brooklyn
21st-century American rappers
21st-century American women musicians
21st-century African-American women
21st-century African-American musicians
20th-century African-American people
20th-century African-American women
21st-century women rappers